The short-nosed unicornfish (Naso brevirostris) is a species of unicornfish in the family Acanthuridae.

Description
These fishes have an elongate, oval body, with a short snout and a small, protrusible mouth. They are olivaceous brown to bluish grey in color, with a prominent horn, many small dark spots on head and short irregular lines on sides of body. The anterior part of the body is rather pale. The tail is whitish with dark blotch. The caudal knives are relatively larger in males (sexual dimorphism). These fishes have six dorsal spines, 27-29 dorsal soft rays and 27-30 anal soft rays. Subadults show dark spots on head and body, while juveniles lack the prominent horn.

Distribution
Naso brevirostris is widespread throughout the Indian and Pacific Oceans. Another species, Naso maculatus, may also be called the spotted unicornfish.

This species is listed as "least concern" on the IUCN Red List of Threatened Species, and there are no observed declines as a result of commercial or recreational fishing.

Habitat
The short-nosed unicornfish dwells in mid-waters along steep outer lagoon, in rocky shore and seaward reef drop-offs, and prefers water temperatures ranging from 22.4 to 29° Celsius.

Biology
This species forms spawning aggregations. Adults feed on algae and zooplankton, while juveniles mainly feed on benthic algae.

Gallery

References

External links
 

Fish of Hawaii
Fish described in 1829
Taxa named by Georges Cuvier
Naso (fish)